You Say, We Say is the second studio album by Irish alternative rock band Royseven. It was released in Ireland on 11 March 2011. It was preceded by the lead single, "Killer", on 19 November 2010 and followed by second single "We Should Be Lovers" on 19 February 2011. "We Should Be Lovers" went on to become the most played Irish song on radio in 2011, beating rivals Westlife, The Script and Snow Patrol.

The album was produced by Andreas Herbig at Boogie Park Studios in Hamburg, Germany.

Track listing

Charts

Credits
Royseven
 Paul Walsh — Lead vocals
 Sam Garland — Lead guitarist
 Eamonn Barrett — Rhythm guitar
 Bernard O'Neill — Bass
 Paul O'Hara — Keyboard
 Darragh Oglesby — Drums

Production
Produced by Andreas Herbig
Recorded and mixed by Andreas Herbig at Boogie Park Studio, Hamburg, Germany
Mastered by Michael Schwabe

References

2011 albums
Royseven albums